Radio Lover is a 1936 British comedy film directed by Paul Capon and Austin Melford and starring Wylie Watson, Ann Penn and Betty Ann Davies.

Cast
 Wylie Watson as Joe Morrison  
 Ann Penn as Miss Oliphant  
 Betty Ann Davies as Wendy Maradyck  
 Jack Melford as Reggie Clifford  
 Cynthia Stock as Miss Swindon  
 Gerald Barry as Sir Hector  
 Max Faber as Brian Maradyck 
 Eric Pavitt as Boy

References

Bibliography
 Low, Rachael. Filmmaking in 1930s Britain. George Allen & Unwin, 1985.
 Wood, Linda. British Films, 1927-1939. British Film Institute, 1986.

External links

1936 films
1936 comedy films
British comedy films
Films shot at British International Pictures Studios
Films set in England
British black-and-white films
Films scored by Eric Spear
1930s English-language films
1930s British films